Skullgrid is the first full-length studio album by Behold... The Arctopus, released in 2007 on Black Market Activities.  It contains seven studio recordings of previously unreleased original compositions.

The album was released on CD and two different versions of vinyl.  The first version was a red/black splattered vinyl colour limited to 300 copies and the second was a white/red splattered vinyl colour limited to 200 copies.  Both versions of the vinyl came with a copy of the CD as well.  The CD and both LP versions were released by Black Market Activities, but only the CD was distributed by Metal Blade Records.

The Jordan Rudess solo in "Transient Exuberance" samples from his portion in Dream Theater's "Octavarium"

Track listing

Personnel
 Colin Marston – bass guitar, recording, mastering, mixing
 Mike Lerner – electric guitar, additional recording, additional editing
 Charlie Zeleny – drums, additional recording, additional editing
 Dani Koesterich - Recording (Rudess solo)
 Terry Grow - Artwork
 Stacy Wakefield Forte - Layout

Guest musicians
 Mick Barr – Guitar solo ("You Are Number Six")
 Jordan Rudess – Continuum solo ("Transient Exuberance")

References

Behold... The Arctopus albums
2007 albums
Albums produced by Colin Marston